Center High School may refer to:

Center High School (California), located in Antelope, California
Center High School (Colorado), located in Center, Colorado
Center High School (Missouri), located in Kansas City, Missouri
Center High School (Texas), located in Center, Texas

See also
Centre High School, located in Lost Springs, Kansas
Central High School (disambiguation)